Pound is a lightweight open source reverse proxy program and application firewall suitable to be used as a web server load balancing solution. Originally developed by an IT security company, it has a strong emphasis on security. The original intent on developing Pound was to allow distributing the load among several Zope servers running on top of ZEO (Zope Extensible Object). However, Pound is not limited to Zope-based installations. Using regular expression matching on the requested URLs, Pound can pass different kinds of requests to different backend server groups. A few more of its most important features:

 detects when a backend server fails or recovers, and bases its load balancing decisions on this information: if a backend server fails, it will not receive requests until it recovers
 decrypts https requests to http ones
 IPv6 support
 can load balance from IPv6 clients to IPv4 servers and vice versa
 rejects incorrect requests
 can be used in a chroot environment
 has no special requirements concerning which web server software or browser to use
 supports virtual hosts
 Server Name Indication (SNI) for SSL/TLS certificate negotiation
 configurable

Pound is distributed under the terms of the GNU General Public License and can be used free of charge even in business environments.

See also

 Apache Traffic Server
 Web accelerator which discusses host-based HTTP acceleration
 Proxy server which discusses client-side proxies
 Reverse proxy which discusses origin-side proxies
 Comparison of web server software
 Internet Cache Protocol

References

External links
 Old Pound website (archived December 2022)
 Pound mailing list (partially archived October 2021)
 Pound reverse proxy "how to" with examples
 Web archive: Pound Best Practice Deployment
 

Free network-related software
Unix network-related software
Reverse proxy